The 2018 season was the Tampa Bay Buccaneers' 43rd in the National Football League and their third under head coach Dirk Koetter.

During their season opener against the Saints, was the Bucs' first time since Super Bowl XXXVII scoring 48 points in a game, with quarterback Ryan Fitzpatrick having a dominant performance. They would also beat the defending champion Philadelphia Eagles in Week 2 and nearly beat the Pittsburgh Steelers during Week 3, both with Fitzpatrick as starting quarterback. However despite their 2–0 start, the first time since 2010 the Bucs began a three game skid with Fitzpatrick being benched for Jameis Winston in Week 4 against the Chicago Bears. Winston started the next three game before being benched in favor for Fitzpatrick against the Cincinnati Bengals. Fitzpatrick went on to start three more games until being benched again for Winston against the New York Giants where Winston would remain the starter for the rest of the season. Despite the Buccaneers leading the league in total passing yards, they only managed to match their 5–11 record from the previous season and finished last in the NFC South for the eighth time in ten seasons. After their Week 15 loss to the Baltimore Ravens, the Buccaneers were eliminated from postseason contention for the 11th straight season. Fitzpatrick posted a 2−5 record while starting while Winston posted a 3−6 recording while starting. The team however set a then franchise record 396 points scored on the season.

On December 30, 2018, head coach Dirk Koetter was fired following a Week 17 loss to the Atlanta Falcons.

NFL Draft

Draft trades
 The Buccaneers traded their third- and fourth-round selections (69th and 108th overall) to the New York Giants in exchange for the Giants' fourth-round selection (102nd overall) and defensive end Jason Pierre-Paul.
 The Buccaneers traded a seventh-round selection in 2019 and free safety J. J. Wilcox to Pittsburgh in exchange for Pittsburgh's sixth-round selection (202nd overall).
 The Buccaneers traded their seventh-round selection (223rd overall) and their seventh-round selection in 2017 (237th overall) to Miami in exchange for Miami's seventh-round selection in 2017 (223rd overall).
 The Buccaneers were awarded a seventh-round compensatory pick (255th overall).
 The Buccaneers traded their first- and seventh-round selections (7th and 255th overall) to the Buffalo Bills in exchange for the Bills' first- and second-round selections (12th, 53rd, and 56th overall).
 The Buccaneers traded their second-round selection (56th overall) to the New England Patriots in exchange for the Patriots' second- and fourth-round selections (63rd and 117th overall).
 The Buccaneers traded their fourth- and sixth-round selections (102nd and 180th overall) to the Minnesota Vikings in exchange for the Vikings' third round selection (94th overall).

Staff

Final roster

Preseason

Regular season

Schedule

Note: Intra-division opponents are in bold text.

Game summaries

Week 1: at New Orleans Saints

Tampa Bay started the 2018 season with Jameis Winston serving a three-game suspension for violating the league's personal conduct policy. Ryan Fitzpatrick started as quarterback and led the Buccaneers to a 48–40 victory over division rival New Orleans. The 48 points scored tied a franchise record for most points scored in a game, with the Bucs also scoring 48 points in Super Bowl XXXVII. Also, the combined score of 88 points from both teams set an NFL record for the most points scored in Week 1. Fitzpatrick threw for 417 yards and 4 touchdown passes, and ran for another touchdown. The scoring frenzy started early after the Saints scored a touchdown on their first drive. The Buccaneers answered with a 58-yard touchdown reception by DeSean Jackson, followed by a 3-yard touchdown run by Fitzpatrick, for a 14–10 lead at the end of the first quarter. In the third quarter, Mike Evans caught a 50-yard touchdown, the second touchdown pass of 50 or more yards. The Buccaneers tied a franchise record with 48 points, and set a team record with 31 first half points. With under five minutes to go, Chandler Catanzaro missed a 44-yard field goal which would have broken the team record outright. Trailing 48–24, the Saints attempted a rally in the fourth quarter. Drew Brees led the Saints on two touchdown drives, and trimmed the deficit to 8 points with just over three minutes remaining. Facing a 3rd down & 11 at their own 24-yard line, Ryan Fitzpatrick scrambled 12 yards for a Buccaneers first down at the two-minute warning. The victory was secure as the Saints had no more time outs, and the Buccaneers took a knee three times to run out the clock.

Week 2: vs. Philadelphia Eagles

Tampa Bay won their second straight game, starting the season 2–0 for the first time since 2010. Quarterback Ryan Fitzpatrick threw for 402 yards and 4 touchdown passes, the first player in NFL history to throw for 400 yards and four touchdown passes in the first two weeks of the season. The game started out with a bang as Fitzpatrick threw a 75-yard touchdown pass to DeSean Jackson on the first play of the game. Second-year tight end O. J. Howard also scored on a 75-yard touchdown pass later in the first half. The Buccaneers largest lead was 27-7 midway through the third quarter. The Eagles scored two touchdowns in the second half to make it a one-score game, but they were not able to score again. The Buccaneers ran the clock down to 19 seconds, giving the Eagles time to run only three plays. With three seconds left in regulation, a Nick Foles pass followed by series of desperation laterals ran out the clock, securing the win for Tampa Bay. With Atlanta defeating Carolina, the Buccaneers lead the NFC South, and remain the only team in the division with an undefeated record.

Week 3: vs. Pittsburgh Steelers

In the final game before Jameis Winston could return from suspension, Tampa Bay lost their first game of the season in their only scheduled primetime game. Ryan Fitzpatrick threw three interceptions in the first half, one returned for a touchdown, as the Buccaneers went into halftime trailing 30–10. In the second half, Fitzpatrick lead a comeback throwing two touchdown passes, and Buccaneers closed to within three points late in the fourth quarter. However, the defense could not stop the Steelers offense and the clock ran out. Fitzpatrick finished the game with 411 yards, three touchdowns and three interceptions, becoming the first quarterback in NFL history to throw for over 400 yards in three consecutive games. With this loss, the Buccaneers fell to 2–1 but still remained atop the NFC South. The Bucs failed to start the season 3-0. The last time they had done so was the 2005 season.

Week 4: at Chicago Bears

Chicago routed Tampa Bay by the score of 48-10. Bears quarterback Mitchell Trubisky threw a franchise record-tying six touchdown passes, five in the first half alone, as Chicago jumped out to a 38–3 halftime lead. After completing only nine passes in the first half, Ryan Fitzpatrick was benched at halftime. Jameis Winston, fresh off his three-game suspension, came in to quarterback the second half. Winston salvaged the day with 16 completions for 145 yards, one touchdown pass, but two interceptions.

Week 6: at Atlanta Falcons

Following this defeat, the Bucs elevated Bucs’ linebackers coach Mark Duffner to defensive coordinator on Monday, replacing Mike Smith.

Week 7: vs. Cleveland Browns

At the end of the third quarter, the Bucs lead 23-9. However, the Browns scored two fourth quarter touchdowns to tie the game at 23. On the final play of regulation, Bucs kicker Chandler Catanzaro missed a 40-yard field goal to take the game into overtime. With under 2 minutes left in OT, Catanzaro came out for another game-winning field goal attempt, this time from 59 yards. The kick was good, giving the Bucs the win and ending their 3 game losing streak. With the win, the Bucs move back to .500 at 3-3 and remain 3rd in the NFC South.

Week 8: at Cincinnati Bengals

This was the first ever NFL game in which both Head Coaches were graduates of Idaho State University.

Week 9: at Carolina Panthers

Week 10: vs. Washington Redskins

Week 11: at New York Giants

In the 3rd quarter, Fitzpatrick was benched after throwing his third interception. Winston came into the game for the first time since being benched for Fitzpatrick in Week 8, who was benched for Winston back in Week 4. Down 24-7, the Bucs mounted a comeback, outscoring the Giants 28-14 through the last quarter and a half. However, the Giants held on during their final drive to win the game. With their 4th straight loss, the Bucs fall to 3-7 and remain 4th in the NFC South. The following day, Winston was renamed the starter for Week 12's game against the 49ers by Coach Koetter.

Week 12: vs. San Francisco 49ers

The Bucs snapped their four game losing streak with a win. Highlights from this game include Jason Pierre-Paul recording his 10th sack of the season, becoming the first Buccaneer to have a double digit sack season since Simeon Rice in 2005, Mike Evans achieving his fifth straight 1,000-yard receiving season and the Buccaneers defense recording their first turnover since Week 3. With this win, the Bucs move to 4-7, but remain last in the NFC South.

Week 13: vs. Carolina Panthers

The Bucs defeated the Panthers after a good defensive effort, including picking off Cam Newton four times, with Andrew Adams responsible for three of the four interceptions. The defense also sacked Newton four times. On offense, Chris Godwin led the team with 101 yards on 5 catches, including a 13-yard touchdown reception. With the win, the Bucs improved to 5-7 and moved to third place in the NFC South.

Week 14: vs. New Orleans Saints

The Bucs fall to 5-8 with this loss. After being up 14-3 at the half, the Saints outscored the Bucs 25-0 in the second half to get the win. Even with the loss, the Bucs still remain third in the NFC South.

Week 15: at Baltimore Ravens

Week 16: at Dallas Cowboys

Week 17: vs. Atlanta Falcons

Despite leading 17-0 shortly before halftime, the Buccaneers lost the lead and fell 20-31 by the fourth quarter. Although they scored twice in the fourth quarter, two failed two-point conversions only gave them a 32-31 lead, and a 37-yard Matt Bryant field goal sealed the 32-34 loss. This loss dropped the Buccaneers to 5-11 and fourth in the NFC South for the second year in a row.

Standings

Division

Conference

Awards
 Week 1: NFC Offensive Player of the Week – Ryan Fitzpatrick
 Week 1: FedEx Air Player of the Week – Ryan Fitzpatrick
 Week 2: NFC Offensive Player of the Week – Ryan Fitzpatrick

References

External links
 

Tampa Bay
Tampa Bay Buccaneers seasons
Tampa Bay Buccaneers